Inner Sound may refer to:

Inner Sound, Scotland, a strait separating the Inner Hebridean islands of Skye, Raasay and South Rona from the Applecross peninsula on the Scottish mainland
Shabda or Śábda (Sanskrit for "speech sound"), variously referred to as the Audible Life Stream, Inner Sound, Sound Current or Word in English; the esoteric essence of God available to all persons, according to the teachings of Eckankar, the Quan Yin Method, Sant Mat, Surat Shabd Yoga, and M.S.I.A. (Movement of Spiritual Inner Awareness)